"Expedition Impossible" is a song performed by Belgian group Hooverphonic. The song was the lead single from the group's sixth studio album The President of the LSD Golf Club (2008). The song is more similar to traditional rock music than previous Hooverphonic songs.

Music video
The music video for "Expedition Impossible" was filmed in Moscow, Russia in 2006. It features the band (Alex, Geike and Raymond) walking through the streets and subways of Moscow, intercut with footage of the band playing at B-2 in Moscow.

The video is entirely black and white.

Song information
Expedition Impossible was premiered at B-2 is Moscow. Alex told audience members that there were cameras in the room and footage would be taken so if audience members were lucky they might "feature in (Hooverphonic's) new video". Some of the footage appeared in the music video.

Chart performance

Links and References

2007 singles
Hooverphonic songs
Songs written by Alex Callier
2007 songs